The 2011 Judo Grand Prix Qingdao was held in Qingdao, China from 17 to 18 December 2011.

Medal summary

Men's events

Women's events

Source Results

Medal table

References

External links
 

2011 IJF World Tour
2011 Judo Grand Prix
Judo
Judo competitions in China
Judo
Judo